Frank Dancevic and Giovanni Lapentti were the defending champions, but they did not compete in the Juniors this year.

Florin Mergea and Horia Tecău defeated Brian Baker and Rajeev Ram in the final, 6–4, 4–6, 6–4 to win the boys' doubles tennis title at the 2002 Wimbledon Championships.

Seeds

  Markus Bayer /  Philipp Petzschner (quarterfinals)
  Ryan Henry /  Todd Reid (quarterfinals)
  Adam Feeney /  Chris Guccione (first round)
  Michel Koning /  Bas van der Valk (second round)
  Marcel Felder /  Martín Vilarrubí (second round)
  Martin Stiegwardt /  Christopher Westerhof (second round)
  Tomáš Berdych /  Steve Darcis (second round, retired)
  Stephen Amritraj /  Lamine Ouahab (quarterfinals)

Draw

Finals

Top half

Bottom half

References

External links

Boys' Doubles
Wimbledon Championship by year – Boys' doubles